The 1959 San Jose State Spartans football team represented San Jose State College during the 1959 NCAA University Division football season.

San Jose State played as an Independent in 1959. The team was led by third-year head coach Bob Titchenal, and played home games at Spartan Stadium in San Jose, California. The Spartans finished the 1959 season with a record of four wins and six losses (4–6). Overall, the team was outscored by its opponents 192–278 for the season.

Schedule

Team players in the NFL
The following San Jose State players were selected in the 1960 NFL Draft.

Notes

References

San Jose State
San Jose State Spartans football seasons
San Jose State Spartans football